North Gallia High School was a public high school located near the village of Vinton, Ohio.  It opened in 1965 and closed in 1992 when it was consolidated into River Valley High School.

History
The North Gallia Local School District was formed in 1965 when the school districts from Bidwell-Porter and Vinton consolidated.

By 1974, declining rural populations, competition for students from the county-wide vocational high school, and the need for a broader sharing of the tax money from the power plant with other schools led to further consolidation, and the North Gallia Local School District was incorporated into the newly formed Gallia County Local School District along with Hannan Trace High School, Kyger Creek High School, and Southwestern High School. The new district did not immediately consolidate the high schools, so North Gallia High School continued until 1992 with the three others. At that time, the other high schools were closed and their students were transported to the Kyger Creek High School building, which was renamed River Valley High School.

Notable alumni

References

External links
 District Website

1965 establishments in Ohio
1992 disestablishments in Ohio
Defunct schools in Ohio
Educational institutions disestablished in 1992
Educational institutions with year of establishment missing
High schools in Gallia County, Ohio
Public high schools in Ohio